"Lucky Ladies" is a single by American country music artist Jeannie Seely. Released in December 1973, the single peaked at #11 on the Billboard Magazine Hot Country Singles chart in 1974. Additionally, "Can I Sleep in Your Arms" charted on the RPM Country Tracks chart in Canada, reaching #17.

Chart performance

References 

1973 singles
Jeannie Seely songs
1973 songs
MCA Records singles
Songs written by Hank Cochran